Jannal Oram is a 2013 Tamil-language road comedy thriller film directed by Karu Pazhaniappan A remake of the 2012 Malayalam film, Ordinary, it stars Parthiban, Vimal, Vidharth, Poorna and Manisha Yadav of Vazhakku Enn 18/9 fame. The story is set in Pannaikadu, a hillside village, with only one bus service to and from a nearby town. The film released on 29 November 2013 to mixed reviews.

Cast

 Parthiban as Bus Driver Karuppu
 Vimal as Bus Conductor Subbiah
 Vidharth as Saamy
 Poorna as Teacher Nirmala David
 Manisha Yadav as Kalyani
 Ramana as Justin
 Shanthi Williams as Justin's mother
 Rajesh as Vinayagam, Village Panchayat Chief (Annan Sir)
 Yuvarani as Subbiah's mother
 Ilavarasu as Police Inspector
 Santhana Bharathi as Senior Bus Repair Mechanic, TNSTC
 Sanjay Bharathi as Siva, Annan sir's son
 Singampuli as Tiyagi Thillai
 Bala Singh as Ex-Village Panchayat Chief
 Joe Malloori as Church Father
 Sriranjini as Siva's mother
 Krishnamoorthy as Drunkard
 Chutti Aravind
 Shivashankar
 Veera Santhanam as Villager
 Monica (Guest role)

Soundtrack

Music was composed by Vidyasagar who composed the original film uniting with Karu Palaniappan for the  sixth time. Behindwoods called it "joyride". Milliblog wrote:"Karu Palaniappan’s record with Vidyasagar is fantastic but – disappointingly – only half-way through the soundtrack".

 "Ennadi Ennadi Oviyame" - Tippu (singer), Vishal
 "Aasa Vecha Manasula" - Tippu, Haricharan, Priya Himesh, Abhirami, Priyadarshini, Velmurugan
 "Ele Malathoppu" - Anuradha Sriram, Velmurugan
 "Unnai Paarkama" - Abhirami, Ceceille, Haricharan
 "Athili Pathili" - K. Lakshman, Aravind, Rishi, Haresh, Aishwarya, Aswitha
 "Aatho Apatho" - Bhoopalam Pragadeesh, Senthil
Lyrics were penned by Yugabharathi

Critical reception
The film received mixed reviews.
 Indiaglitz wrote:"Jannal Oram' is an interesting journey, which turns a thriller in the second half. Stopping by to take note of most of the small emotions and gestures we miss in our everyday rush, the film is an interesting tale of a humble small town".
 Behindwoods wrote:"Palaniappan takes his own time to begin the actual film just before the interval and it is the post-interval block where all the drama happens and keeps you engaged fairly. The climax is also stretched more than necessary and when the suspense gets lengthened, it actually loses its purpose".
 Times of India wrote:"Overall, the film is competently put together and somewhat interesting but you cannot escape a lingering feeling that it should have been a little ambitious and much better".
 Sify wrote:"The major problem with Jannal Oram a scene-by-scene remake of the original is the over-the top performances by lead actors, especially Parthipan. The director should have known that the likes of Parthipan and Prakashraj are past their sell-by dates and can only add to unwanted irritations and nuisances. A very similar irritating Sathyaraj seems to have realised it about himself and has stopped irritating audiences".

Box office
The film took average opening and grossed Rs. 4.50 crore in first week.

References

External links
 

2013 films
2010s Tamil-language films
Tamil remakes of Malayalam films
Films scored by Vidyasagar
Films directed by Karu Pazhaniappan